Kochi Tuskers Kerala was a franchise cricket team that played in the Indian Premier League (IPL) representing the city of Kochi, Kerala. The team was one of two new franchises added to the IPL for the 2011 season, alongside Pune Warriors India. The team franchise was owned by Kochi Cricket Pvt Ltd., which was a consortium of multiple companies.

The KTK only played for one season, in 2011, and was terminated the following year.

Franchise history

The auction for expanding the initial eight franchises for the Indian Premier League was held on 22 March 2010. The cities involved were Pune, Ahmedabad, Kochi, Nagpur, Kanpur, Dharamsala, Visakhapatnam, Rajkot, Cuttack, Vadodara, Indore and Gwalior. Two new teams were selected out of 12 cities. Sahara Group made the highest bid in the auction and chose to base its team in Pune, at the cost of US$370m (1702 crore). Rendezvous Sports World made the second highest bid of US$333.2m(1533 crores), and elected to base its team in Kochi. The two new franchises were sold for a combined sum greater than the combined purchase price of the original eight franchises.

Team name and home ground issues
The franchise initially announced that the name of the team would be "Indi Commandos". This led to negative responses worldwide. The franchise management suggested that a move to Ahmedabad was possible, moving the team away from Kochi, due in part to a comparatively high entertainment tax in Kerala (36%). This invoked a mass response on social networks, particularly on Facebook, forcing management to change the team name and logo. A poll on the franchise's official website eventually determined the team name. The decision to move the home ground was dropped when the Corporation of Cochin waived 50% of the entertainment tax levee.

Termination from the IPL
Due to a dispute amongst the team owners, the franchise failed to pay the 10% bank guarantee element of the franchise fee which was supposed to be paid before the 2011 season began. The BCCI claimed that it had sent several requests for payment to the franchise owners but received no response. On 19 September 2011, then BCCI president N. Srinivasan announced that the franchise was being terminated because it had failed to provide the bank guarantee. On 14 October 2011, the IPL Governing Council announced that there would be only nine teams participating in 2012 after the Kochi franchise was expelled. The players from the side were auctioned to other franchises in the 2012 IPL player auction. Players who attracted no bids had their salaries covered via the team's bank guarantee from the previous season.

On 13 January 2012, the BCCI asked overseas players who had signed a contract with the franchise to sue the owners, with the BCCI included as a party to each case.

In February 2012, Rendezvous Sports World announced that it would take the BCCI to court over its termination from the IPL. In July 2015, a court-appointed arbitrator Justice Lahoti ordered the BCCI to pay  as compensation for terminating the franchise agreement. ESPNCricinfo reported that the franchise owners had requested the BCCI to permit the team to return to the IPL, in lieu of the compensation awarded by the arbitrator.

Team identity
The team's shirt colours were purple and orange with orange trousers.

 The franchise's signature song was composed by veteran film score composer Ouseppachan. The music video for the song was filmed by Priyadarshan and his cinematographer Thiru. The song was shot at various locales including Paravur, Cherraai, Varapuzha backwaters and the Jawaharlal Nehru Stadium. It features almost all the leading players in the team as well as Malayalam movie actress Rima Kallingal.

Seasons

Result summary

Overall

By opposition

Home grounds

The two home grounds of the Kochi Tuskers Kerala were the Jawaharlal Nehru Stadium in Kochi and Holkar Cricket Stadium, Indore. Five homes matches were held at Kochi and two at Indore. The Greater Cochin Development Authority completely over-hauled the Jawaharlaal Nehru Stadium to cater for hosting IPL matches.

Kit manufacturers and sponsors
Federal Bank, a major Indian commercial bank in the private sector, with its headquarters in Aluva, Kerala, was the principal sponsor of Kochi Tuskers Kerala. Lotto, an Italian sports goods manufacturer, was the apparel sponsor, V-Guard, an electronics company, and AVT, a tea brand, were the associate sponsors with Elite Foods, Parinee Developers and Anchor Earth are the other main sponsors.

See also
List of controversies involving the Indian Premier League

References 

 
Indian Premier League teams
Sport in Kochi
Sports clubs in India
Cricket clubs established in 2010
Sports clubs disestablished in 2011
2011 disestablishments in India
Former senior cricket clubs of India
Cricket in Kerala
2010 establishments in Kerala